The Ambassador of the United Kingdom to Mauritania is the United Kingdom's foremost diplomatic representative in the Islamic Republic of Mauritania.

Mauritania became an independent state in 1960, but the United Kingdom did not have a resident ambassador until 2018: the British ambassador to Senegal was also non-resident ambassador to Mauritania from 1960 to 1990, and the Ambassador to Morocco was non-resident ambassador to Mauritania from 1990 to 2018. In 2018 the United Kingdom upgraded its office in Nouakchott to an embassy and appointed a resident ambassador.

Ambassadors
 1960–1990, see List of ambassadors of the United Kingdom to Senegal.
 1990–2018, see List of ambassadors of the United Kingdom to Morocco.
 2018–2019: Samuel Thomas
 2019–2021: Simon Boyden 

 2021–: Colin Wells

References

External links

Mauritania
United Kingdom
United Kingdom